Opera News is an American classical music magazine. It has been published since 1936 by the Metropolitan Opera Guild, a non-profit organization located at Lincoln Center which was founded to promote opera and also support the Metropolitan Opera of New York City. Opera News was initially focused primarily on the Met, particularly providing information for listeners of the Saturday afternoon live Metropolitan Opera radio broadcasts. Over the years, the magazine has broadened its scope to include the larger American and international opera scenes. Currently published monthly, Opera News offers opera related feature articles; artist interviews; production profiles; musicological pieces; music-business reportage; reviews of performances in the United States and Europe; reviews of recordings, videos, books and audio equipment; and listings of opera performances in the U.S.

The Editor-in-Chief is currently F. Paul Driscoll. Regular contributors to the magazine, both past and present, include its former features editor, Brian Kellow, William Ashbrook, Scott Barnes, Jochen Breiholz, Erika Davidson, Justin Davidson, Peter G. Davis, Matthew Gurewitsch, Joel Honig, Tim Page, Judith Malafronte, Mark Thomas Ketterson, Martin Bernheimer, Ira Siff, Joanne Sydney Lessner, Anne Midgette, Drew Minter, William R. Braun, Phillip Kennicott, Joshua Rosenblum, Leslie Rubinstein, Alan Wagner, Adam Wasserman, Oussama Zahr, and William Zakariasen.

The magazine is also available online, with some archival content going back to 1949. The web site was redesigned in spring 2010. Some of the online content is available only to subscribers to the print edition.

History

Opera News was founded in 1936 by the Metropolitan Opera Guild with Mrs. John DeWitt Peltz (Mary Ellis Peltz) serving as the publication's first editor. It was initially intended to be a "useful, instructive, and factual weekly newspaper of Opera in New York". Its first issue was published on 7 December 1936 and consisted of only one folded broadsheet. Beginning with the December 1940 issue, the magazine began to concentrate much of its content on the weekly Metropolitan Opera radio broadcasts. The magazine at this point offered bi-weekly issues of an expanded size during the Fall, Winter, and Spring, but was on hiatus during the summers. As time went on, the magazine began to take on a more international scope of coverage; but it still maintained a strong interest in the New York opera scene and the Met in particular.

In 1972, the magazine became a year-round publication, adding monthly issues in the summer months while maintaining its bi-weekly schedule during the opera season. In 1974, Robert Jacobson became the magazine's third chief editor. Jacobson was succeeded by Patrick O'Connor (1988), who was succeeded in 1989 by Patrick J. Smith. In 1998, Smith was succeeded by Rudolph S. Rauch. Under the leadership of Rauch and executive editor Brian Kellow, the magazine switched to a monthly publication format in September 1998. F. Paul Driscoll, the current editor in chief, was appointed in July 2003.

Beginning with the June 2012 issue, the Metropolitan Opera said that Opera News would cease reviewing Met performances, following dissatisfaction among the Met leadership with the magazine's recent critiques of Robert Lepage's production of the Ring Cycle and of the company's direction under Peter Gelb. However, reactions from the public led to the decision being reversed.

Opera News Awards
Since 2005 the magazine has annually bestowed five Opera News Awards for Distinguished Achievement.

Past recipients of the awards have included:
1st2005: James Conlon, Régine Crespin, Plácido Domingo, Susan Graham, Dolora Zajick
2nd2006: Ben Heppner, James Levine, René Pape, Renata Scotto, Deborah Voigt
3rd2007: Stephanie Blythe, Olga Borodina, Thomas Hampson, Leontyne Price, Julius Rudel
4th2008: John Adams (composer), Natalie Dessay, Renée Fleming, Marilyn Horne, Sherrill Milnes
5th2009: Martina Arroyo, Joyce DiDonato, Shirley Verrett, Gerald Finley, Philip Glass
6th2010: Jonas Kaufmann, Riccardo Muti, Patricia Racette, Kiri Te Kanawa, Bryn Terfel
7th2011: Karita Mattila, Anja Silja, Dmitri Hvorostovsky, Peter Mattei, Peter Sellars
8th2012: David Daniels, Simon Keenlyside, Eric Owens, Mirella Freni, Dawn Upshaw
9th2013: Patrice Chéreau, Juan Diego Flórez, Christa Ludwig, James Morris, Nina Stemme
10th2014: Piotr Beczała, Ferruccio Furlanetto, Sondra Radvanovsky, Samuel Ramey, Teresa Stratas
11th2015: Joseph Calleja, Elīna Garanča, Waltraud Meier, Anna Netrebko, José van Dam
12th2016: Robert Carsen, Christine Goerke, Yannick Nézet-Séguin, Matthew Polenzani, Frederica von Stade
13th2017: William Christie, Fiorenza Cossotto, Vittorio Grigolo, Hei-Kyung Hong, Sonya Yoncheva
14th2018: Ramón Vargas, Ailyn Pérez, Luca Pisaroni, Laurent Pelly, Rosalind Elias
15th2019:  Thomas Allen, Javier Camarena, Anthony Roth Costanzo, Diana Damrau, Ana María Martínez
16th2020: Lawrence Brownlee, Janet Baker, Cecilia Bartoli
17th2021: Denyce Graves, Quinn Kelsey, Elza van den Heever

Notes and references
Notes

References

External links
 
 Metropolitan Opera Guild

1936 establishments in New York City
Magazines about opera
Magazines established in 1936
Magazines published in New York City
Monthly magazines published in the United States
Music magazines published in the United States